Electron Pair Production may refer to:
 Cooper pairing of electrons in superconductor
 Electron-positron pair production
 Electron-hole pair generation in semiconductor
 Pairing of electrons on the same atomic or molecular orbital